The Val Nure is the valley of the Nure river, a tributary of the Po. The valley lies almost entirely in the Province of Piacenza, in the Emilia-Romagna region of Italy. It forms part of the Comunità Montana Valli del Nure e dell'Arda.

Geography
The source of the Nure is at the Lago Nero. The valley lies between the Val d'Arda to the east, the Valle del Ceno to the south-east, the Val d'Aveto to the south-west and the Val Trebbia to the west.

The Val Nure lies in the Colli Piacentini, or "hills of Piacenza", wine-growing region. Colli Piacentini Valnure is a Denominazione di Origine Controllata white wine made in the comuni of Ponte dell'Olio, San Giorgio Piacentino and Vigolzone from Malvasia di Candia aromatica, Ortrugo and Trebbiano Romagnolo grape varieties.

History

In feudal times control of the valley was disputed between the Anguissola, Camia, Malaspina and Nicelli families. In the early 17th century it passed into the hands of Ottavio Farnese. There are some eighty castles and fortifications in the valley, among them the Castello di Riva at Ponte dell'Olio, and the castles of Altoè, of Grazzano Visconti, of Paderna, of Podenzano and of Vigolzone.

International relations

Twin towns – Sister cities
Val Nure is twinned with:
 Nogent-sur-Marne, France

References

Further reading
 Carmen Artocchini (1983) Castelli piacentini (in Italian). Piacenza: [s.n.]

Valleys of Emilia-Romagna